Constance of Penthièvre (1140 – after 1184) was a Breton princess, daughter of Alan of Penthièvre, 1st Earl of Richmond, and Bertha of Cornouaille, suo jure Duchess of Brittany.

Life
Constance was the daughter of Bertha, daughter of Conan III, Duke of Brittany and Matilda FitzRoy, and of Alan the Black, Earl of Richmond, younger son of Stephen of Penthièvre and Havoise of Guingamp. She was the sister of Duke Conan IV of Brittany and Enoguen, Abbess of Saint-Sulpice.

On 15 September 1146, her father died and two years later her mother married Odo II, Viscount of Porhoët, who became regent of Brittany during Conan IV's minority.

Marriages
In 1160, after the marriage of her brother Conan IV with Margaret of Huntingdon, the sister of the Scots king Malcolm IV, a marriage between Malcolm and Constance was considered. Constance refused, hoping to wed King Louis VII, whose wife Constance of Castile had just died. However, Louis VII decided to marry Adèle of Champagne instead.

Constance married firstly William FitzEmpress, a.k.a. “Tournemine”, third son of Geoffrey V, Count of Anjou and Empress Matilda, and younger brother of King Henry II of England and Geoffrey, Count of Nantes. William was the founder of the House of Tournemine. However, there is no evidence for this marriage, and no evidence of William Tournemine's exact identity either If this marriage did take place, it must have been celebrated after Louis VII married Adèle of Champagne on 13 November 1160.
	
Constance married secondly Alan III, Viscount of Rohan, and founded the Abbaye Notre-Dame de Bon-Repos with him on 23 June 1184. She probably died soon after and her husband remarried.

Issue
If Constance did marry William of Tournemine, she was the mother of:
 Oliver I of Tournemine († before 1205), who married Edie (or Eline) of Penthièvre, daughter of Rivallo, Count of Penthièvre and sister of Geoffrey III of Penthièvre. They had three sons and two daughters:
 Oliver II of Tournemine († c. 1232), Lord of La Hunaudaye;
 Geoffrey I of Tournemine;
 Peter of Tournemine;
 Margilia of Tournemine;
 Sybilla of Tournemine.
 Geoffrey of Tournemine.

With Alan III, Viscount of Rohan, she had:
 Alan IV
 William;
 Josselin, who married Matilda of Montfort, daughter of William II of Montfort
 Margaret, who married Harvey I, Lord of Léon
 Alix;
 Constance, who married Odo of Pontchâteau

Notes

References

Sources

12th-century births
12th-century Breton women
12th-century Breton people
House of Rohan
Daughters of British earls
Year of death unknown